Caution may refer to:

 A precautionary statement, describing a potential hazard
 A police caution, an alternative to prosecution for a criminal offence in some countries such as the United Kingdom and Australia
 A statement read by a police officer to a suspect to inform them of their rights, in particular to silence. See e.g.:
 Miranda warning in the United States
 Right to silence in England and Wales
Right to silence, which discusses the international situation
 Yellow card (sports)
 La Caution, a French hip hop duo 
 Caution flag, in auto racing
 Caution (Do Not Stop On Tracks), a song by the Grateful Dead 
 Caution (Hot Water Music album), 2002
 Caution (Left Spine Down album), 2011, or the title track
 Caution, a snippet song by XXXTentacion
 Caution (Mariah Carey album), 2018, or the title track
 Caution, a 2020 song by The Killers
 CAUTION (Citizens against Unnecessary Thoroughfares in Older Neighborhoods), a 1970s-80's neighborhood group in Atlanta, Georgia that fought the construction of the "Presidential Parkway"

See also